Manish Grover (born 24 June 1951) is a Bharatiya Janata Party (BJP) politician and a former Member of the Legislative Assembly, representing Rohtak constituency in the Vidhan Sabha.

Personal life

Manish Grover was born to Wazir Chand and Seeta Devi Grover on 15 July 1954 in Rohtak. He joined Jan Sangh in 1971. In 1987, he successfully contested the Municipal Corporation Elections from Ghani Pura, Rohtak.

He married Veena Grover on 3 February 1982. They have two children Himanshu and Rashmi. Himanshu is married to Somya Khurana and lives in Rohtak. Rashmi is married to Gaurav Ahuja, and lives in Delhi.

References

1954 births
Living people
Hindu activists
Indian Hindus
People from Rohtak district
Rashtriya Swayamsevak Sangh pracharaks
Haryana MLAs 2014–2019
Punjabi people
Bharatiya Janata Party politicians from Haryana